Raheem Owolabi Isiaka (born 14 June 1991) is a Nigerian footballer who plays as a centre forward for Iraqi Premier League club Al-Hedood FC.

Career
Owolabi has played club football for First Bank and Shooting Stars.

He left Shooting Stars at the end of the 2011-12 season, going to play in the Iraqi league. In 2013, he played in the Iraqi Premier League with Al-Zawraa.

In September 2014, he signed a one-year term contract with Iraqi Premier League club, Al-Masafi until 2015.
 
He moved back to Al-Najaf FC in January 2016 and Karbalaa FC in 2017.

References

External links
 The database of player in thefinalball.com

1997 births
Nigerian footballers
Nigeria international footballers
Shooting Stars S.C. players
Expatriate footballers in Iraq
Living people
Association football forwards
Nigerian expatriates in Iraq
Al-Kahrabaa FC players